This is a list of people from Poulton-le-Fylde, a market town in Lancashire, in the North West of England.

Academia
George Long (1800–1879), classical scholar

Politics
Robert Parkinson Tomlinson (1881–1943), Liberal politician

Arts and entertainment
 Larry Cassidy (1952–2010), Jenny Ross (1962-2004), Vincent Cassidy, Paul Wiggin and Angela Cassidy, musicians in Section 25
 Ian Stuart Donaldson (1957–1993), punk rock musician and frontman of Skrewdriver
 Keith Harris (1947-2015), ventriloquist, lived in Poulton-le-Fylde
 Tessie O'Shea (1913–1995), actress and music hall entertainer, lived in "Mulberry Cottage" on Breck Road for many years
 Andy Summers (born 1942), rock musician, guitarist with The Police

Sports
 John Curtis (born 1954), former professional footballer
 Georgie Mee (1900–1978), former professional footballer
 Fred Pagnam (1891–1962), former professional footballer
 Paul Stewart (born 1964), former professional footballer
Tony Green (born 1946) former professional footballer who played for Scotland went on to be a teacher in Poulton-le-Fylde

References

Poulton

People From Poulton-Le-Fylde